Nun is the fourteenth letter of the Semitic abjads, including Phoenician Nūn , Hebrew Nūn  , Aramaic Nūn  , Syriac Nūn ܢܢ, and Arabic Nūn  (in abjadi order). Its numerical value is 50. It is the third letter in Thaana, pronounced as "noonu". In all languages, it represents the alveolar nasal /n/.

The Phoenician letter gave rise to the Greek nu (Ν), Etruscan , Latin N, and Cyrillic Н.

Origins
Nun is believed to be derived from an Egyptian hieroglyph of a snake (the Hebrew word for snake, nachash begins with a Nun and snake in Aramaic is nun) or eel. Some have hypothesized a hieroglyph of fish in water as its origin (in Arabic,  means large fish or whale). The Phoenician letter was named  "fish", but the glyph has been suggested to descend from a hypothetical Proto-Canaanite  "snake", based on the name in Ethiopic, ultimately from a hieroglyph representing a snake, I10
(see Middle Bronze Age alphabets).

Hebrew Nun

Hebrew spelling: 

The letter in its final position appears with or without a top hook on different sans-serif fonts, for example
 Arial, DejaVu Sans, Arimo, Open Sans: ן
 Tahoma, Noto Sans Hebrew, Alef, Heebo: ן

Pronunciation
Nun represents an alveolar nasal,, like the English letter N.

Variations
Nun, like Kaph, Mem, Pe, and Tzadi, has a final form, used at the end of words. Its shape changes from נ to ן.
There are also nine instances of an inverted nun (׆) in the Tanakh.

Significance
In gematria, Nun represents the number 50. Its final form represents 700 but this is rarely used, Tav and Shin (400+300) being used instead.

As in Arabic, nun as an abbreviation can stand for neqevah, feminine. 
In medieval Rabbinic writings, Nun Sophit (Final Nun) stood for "Son of" (Hebrew ben).

Nun is also one of the seven letters which receive a special crown (called a tag: plural tagin   ) when written in a Sefer Torah. See Tag (Hebrew writing), Shin, Ayin, Teth, Gimmel, Zayin, and Tzadi.

In the game of dreidel, a rolled Nun passes play to the next player with no other action.

Arabic nūn

The letter is named , and is written is several ways depending in its position in the word:

Some examples on its uses in Modern Standard Arabic:

Nūn is used as a suffix indicating present-tense plural feminine nouns; for example  hiya taktub ("she writes") becomes  hunna yaktubna ("they [feminine] write").

Nūn is also used as the prefix for first-person plural imperfective/present tense verbs. Thus  huwwa yaktub ("he writes") →  naḥnu naktub ("we write").

Punjabi/Saraiki nūn
It is retroflex nasal  consonantal sound  symbol, used in some spoken languages. Like all the retroflex consonants, the IPA symbol is formed by adding a rightward-pointing hook extending from the bottom of an en (the letter used for the corresponding alveolar consonant).
It is a compound of nūn and rre (⟨ڑ⟩). For example:
کݨ مݨ، چھݨ چھݨ، ونڄݨ۔

Social media campaign (2014)

After the fall of Mosul, ISIL demanded Assyrian Christians in the city to convert to Islam, pay tribute, or face execution. ISIL begun marking homes of Christian residents with the letter nūn for Nassarah ("Nazarene"). Thousands of Christians, Yazidis (the latter of whom were given only the choice of conversion or death) and other, mostly Shi'a, Muslims, as well as any Muslim whose allegiance was to their home country (whom ISIL consider to be apostates) abandoned their homes and land.

In response to the persecution of Christians and Yazidis by ISIL, an international social media campaign was launched to raise global awareness of the plight of religious minorities in Mosul, making use of the letter  (nun)—the mark that ISIL troops spray painted on properties owned by Christians. Some Christians changed their profile pictures on Facebook and Twitter to pictures of the letter  as a symbol of support.

The word naṣārā/nosrim designates Christians in both Arabic, Aramaic and Hebrew. The more common term used to refer to Christians in Modern Standard Arabic is masihi (plural ).

Character encodings

See also
Nunation
Setaceous Hebrew Character (Xestia c-nigrum) - a moth of the family Noctuidae.

References

Phoenician alphabet
Arabic letters
Hebrew letters
Letters with final form